The Meridiana Tunnel is a railway tunnel in the Spanish city of Barcelona. Built in the 1970s, it replaced the previously existing railway that ran in a cutting in the middle of Avinguda Meridiana through the city centre.

Services
The tunnel is served by Rodalies de Catalunya services R1, R3, R4 and R7.

Stations

Barcelona Sants
Plaça de Catalunya
Arc de Triomf
La Sagrera-Meridiana
Sant Andreu Arenal

See also
Aragó Tunnel

References

Rail transport in Barcelona
Underground commuter rail